The Furnace Carolina Site (also known as RI-2045; Abbott Run; Arnold Mills Furnace) is an historic site of a blast furnace in Cumberland, Rhode Island along the Abbott Run river.

History
The colonial industrial furnace was originally built around 1734 by Eliezer Metcalf. The Furnace Carolina was named after Caroline of Ansbach, the wife of England's King George II. The furnace was located in an area with an abundance of iron ore and purportedly cast cannon for use during the French and Indian Wars. The site was added to the National Register of Historic Places in 1993.

See also
Arnold Mills Historic District
National Register of Historic Places listings in Providence County, Rhode Island

References

1734 establishments in Rhode Island
Industrial buildings completed in 1734
Buildings and structures in Cumberland, Rhode Island
Industrial buildings and structures on the National Register of Historic Places in Rhode Island
National Register of Historic Places in Providence County, Rhode Island
Caroline of Ansbach
Blast furnaces in the United States